The 2018 FIBA U16 Women's European Championship was the 30th edition of the Women's European basketball championship for national under-16 teams. It was held in Kaunas, Lithuania, from 17 to 25 August 2018. Italy won their first title in this age level after beating the Czech Republic in the final 60-52. It was Italy's first ever gold medal after six silver medals and seven bronze medals.

Venues

Participating teams
  (Runners-up, 2017 FIBA U16 Women's European Championship Division B)

  (Winners, 2017 FIBA U16 Women's European Championship Division B)

 (Hosts)

First round

Group A

Group B

Group C

Group D

Knockout stage

Bracket

5th place bracket

9th place bracket

13th place bracket

Final standings

All-Tournament Team
  Caterina Gilli (MVP)
  Katerina Zeithammerova
  Marta García
  Mama Dembele
  Sude Yilmaz

References

External links
FIBA official website

2018
2018–19 in European women's basketball
2017–18 in Lithuanian basketball
International youth basketball competitions hosted by Lithuania
International women's basketball competitions hosted by Lithuania
Sports competitions in Kaunas
2018 in youth sport
August 2018 sports events in Europe